Qazi Gavaber (also Romanized as Qāẕī Gavāber) is a village in Ahandan Rural District, in the Central District of Lahijan County, Gilan Province, Iran. At the 2006 census, its population was 54, in 16 families.

References 

Populated places in Lahijan County